The Twin Sister is a 1915 American silent comedy film featuring Oliver Hardy.

Plot

Cast
 Mae Hotely as Eva Bolt/Nancy, her twin sister
 Oliver Hardy as Bill Bolt

See also
 List of American films of 1915
 Oliver Hardy filmography

External links

1915 films
American silent short films
American black-and-white films
1915 comedy films
1915 short films
Films directed by Arthur Hotaling
Silent American comedy films
American comedy short films
1910s American films